Frankie Goes to Hollywood were an English synth-pop band formed in Liverpool in 1980. The group's best-known line-up comprised Holly Johnson (vocals), Paul Rutherford (backing vocals), Peter Gill (drums, percussion), Mark O'Toole (bass guitar) and Brian Nash (guitar).

The group's 1983 debut single "Relax" was banned by the BBC in 1984 while at number six in the charts and subsequently topped the UK Singles Chart for five consecutive weeks, going on to enjoy prolonged chart success throughout that year and ultimately becoming the seventh-best-selling UK single of all time. It also won the 1985 Brit Award for Best British Single. Their debut album, Welcome to the Pleasuredome, reached number one in the UK in 1984 with advanced sales of more than one million. After the follow-up success of "Two Tribes" and "The Power of Love", the group became only the second act in the history of the UK charts to reach number one with their first three singles; the first being fellow Liverpudlians Gerry and the Pacemakers in the 1960s. This record remained unbeaten until the Spice Girls achieved a six-single streak in 1996–1997.

In 1985 the band won the Brit Award for British Breakthrough Act. Associated with the Second British Invasion of the US, they also received Grammy Award and MTV Video Music Award nominations for Best New Artist. Songwriters Johnson, Gill and O'Toole received the 1984 Ivor Novello Award from the British Academy of Songwriters, Composers, and Authors for Best Song Musically and Lyrically for "Two Tribes". In 2015, the song was voted by the British public as the nation's 14th-favourite 1980s number one in a poll for ITV.

History

Formation
Frankie Goes to Hollywood were formed in 1980. On the B-side to the group's first single, Johnson explained that the group's name derived from a page from The New Yorker magazine, showing the headline "Frankie Goes Hollywood" and a picture of Frank Sinatra, although the magazine page Johnson referred to was actually a pop art poster by Guy Peellaert featuring a newspaper headline above an image of a young Sinatra being mobbed by his fans.

The nucleus of the group emerged from the late 1970s Liverpool punk scene. Lead singer Johnson had played bass with Big in Japan and had also released two solo singles. Local musicians Peter Gill (drums), Jed O'Toole (bass), and O'Toole's cousin Brian Nash (guitar) initially joined Johnson, calling themselves Sons and Egypt. This line-up secured a number of small local gigs before disbanding.

The group was reprised when Johnson joined Mark O'Toole (bass) and Peter "Ped" Gill to form FGTH. During a particularly fluid period of personnel changes, Jed O'Toole joined FGTH on guitar, and a female vocalist, Sonia Mazumder, was also a band member for the first Frankie gig at the Leeds nightclub "The Warehouse", supporting Hambi & The Dance. Paul Rutherford—a member of the headline act who had also sung in seminal Liverpool punk band The Spitfire Boys—apparently got so caught up in Frankie's performance that he effectively replaced Mazumder that very night. The new all-male musical line-up subsequently toured locally with a leather-clad female duo known as "The Leatherpets" and managed to fund promotional videos and demos, despite being eventually turned down by both Arista Records and Phonogram Inc. In October 1982, the group recorded a John Peel Session for BBC Radio 1, comprising the originals "Krisco Kisses", "Two Tribes", "Disneyland", and "The World Is My Oyster". Around this time Jed O'Toole left the group, to be replaced by the returning Brian Nash.

Nash said the band looked up to Echo & the Bunnymen, Orchestral Manoeuvres in the Dark (OMD) and The Teardrop Explodes, adding, "That was music from Liverpool but from our generation. You would see these people walking around town, you'd see Ian McCulloch getting on the bus. I never saw any of the Beatles on the bus."

In February 1983, the group was invited to record a video for "Relax" by the Channel 4 show The Tube at the Liverpool State Ballroom. After the broadcast, the Peel session was repeated on radio, and a new session recorded for the BBC, comprising "Welcome to the Pleasuredome", "The Only Star in Heaven" and "Relax". These performances, along with a repeat of the Tube video, convinced Trevor Horn to sign the group for his new label, ZTT Records, in May 1983.

"Relax"

"Relax" was released by ZTT in October 1983, with production and remix directed by Trevor Horn, received a modicum of airplay, allowing it steady progress into the UK Top 40. Following a debut on the BBC's Top of the Pops on 5 January 1984 while at number 35, the single rose to number six the following week.

On 11 January 1984, BBC Radio 1 disc jockey Mike Read was playing the record on his show when he noticed the front cover design (by Yvonne Gilbert). Read apparently became outraged by the "overtly sexual" nature of both the record sleeve and the printed lyrics, which prompted him to remove the disc from the turntable live on air, branding it "obscene".

Two days later — almost three months after the single's initial release, and just eight days after the group's Top of the Pops appearance — the BBC banned the record from all its TV and radio outlets. "Relax" immediately shot to number one in the UK charts and stayed there for five weeks, during which time the BBC could not show the nation's best-selling single on Top of the Pops.

The original video was directed by Bernard Rose and depicted a gay S&M parlour where the band members were admired by muscular leathermen, a bleached blonde drag queen, and a large man dressed as a Roman emperor. The video contained a scene in which one of the band members wrestled a live tiger, to the admiration of the clubgoers, and ended where the "emperor" was so excited he shimmied out of his toga. Filmed in the unused East London theatre Wilton's Music Hall, it was promptly banned by both the BBC and MTV, resulting in the production of a substitute video directed by filmmaker Brian De Palma to coincide with the release of his film Body Double. There have been four official music videos for "Relax".

The BBC lifted its ban on "Relax" at the end of 1984 to allow the band to perform it on the Christmas edition of Top of the Pops (it had been, aside from Band Aid the biggest-selling single of the year).

"Two Tribes"
"Relax" remained in the charts when the follow-up, "Two Tribes", was released in May 1984. The anti-war song was given an aggressively topical nuclear war slant. Featuring sirens, the unmistakable voice of Patrick Allen (who had voiced the British Government's actual nuclear warning ads, Protect and Survive, two years earlier) and another innovative electronic backing, it went straight into the UK charts at Number One and stayed there for nine weeks (the first single to do so since John Travolta and Olivia Newton-John's "You're the One That I Want" in 1978), with total sales exceeding 1.5 million copies and becoming one of the top 30 best-selling records in the UK ever.

Directed by Kevin Godley and Lol Creme, the video showed lookalikes of Cold War leaders Ronald Reagan and Konstantin Chernenko wrestling in a marquee while band members and others laid bets on the outcome. Ultimately, the audience — consisting of other world leaders — were brought into the fight, and eventually Earth was seen to explode.

"Two Tribes" was a successful single in its own right, but its reign at the top of the charts was made even more notable by the continuing success of its predecessor. "Relax" had made a natural decline down the charts by May 1984, but on the release of "Two Tribes" its sales began to increase again, to the extent that FGTH held the top two spots in the UK charts during July 1984, the first active group to do so since the early 1960s.

The release of "Two Tribes" also coincided with an extensive and iconic T-shirt marketing campaign during the British summer of 1984, featuring such slogans as "Frankie Says War! Hide Yourself" and "Frankie Says Relax Don't Do It!"

"The Power of Love"
FGTH released a third single, "The Power of Love", at the end of 1984. Unlike the earlier singles, this song was a slower-paced ballad, but it also went to Number One in December and making the band the first act for two decades (since Gerry and the Pacemakers, a fellow Liverpool band, in 1963) to achieve chart-toppers with its first three releases. The video (directed once again by Godley & Creme) was not banned on this occasion but still caused trouble for the group—because it depicted a nativity scene (and on its first showing did not show any band members, who were subsequently added as picture framing).

The song's release was preceded by an advertising campaign that, cheekily, declared it to be the band's third number one single, as if this was a fait accompli. The Band Aid project, for which Johnson recorded a message for the B-side, meant that FGTH managed only one week at the top this time before it was replaced by "Do They Know It's Christmas?"

"Welcome to the Pleasuredome"
The title track from FGTH's album, "Welcome to the Pleasuredome", was released as a fourth single in March 1985. Early promotional posters for the single proclaimed it as "their fourth number one", even prior to the single's release. However, the single peaked at Number 2. Each 12-inch mix was prefaced by a spoken-word introduction adapted from Friedrich Nietzsche's The Birth of Tragedy. For the first mix ("Real Altered"), the intro was spoken by Gary Taylor, for the second ("Fruitness") by actor Geoffrey Palmer.

Only one new track appeared in the next eighteen months; "Disneyland", was released on the ZTT Records "Zang Tuum Tumb Sampled" album in late 1985.

Return and decline
In 1986, FGTH appeared at the Montreux Rock Festival which was broadcast on UK television. This performance saw the first airings of two future singles, namely "Rage Hard" and "Warriors of the Wasteland". Both versions were different from the versions eventually released. In August 1986, the long-awaited new Frankie Goes to Hollywood single, "Rage Hard", was released, reaching number 4 in the UK. Initially showcased promotionally with songs like "Warriors of the Wasteland", the group's sound had developed a significantly harder edge with a less flamboyant, more nitty-gritty lyrical side. The album, Liverpool, was released in October 1986 and reached UK No. 5. It was generally panned by the music press and chart returns declined rapidly with the follow-up singles "Warriors of the Wasteland" (No. 19) and "Watching the Wildlife" (No. 28). The group meanwhile threatened to implode of its own accord, in the course of a tour promoting the new album. Johnson kept himself markedly separate from the rest of the band when offstage during this period, tensions becoming exacerbated during a backstage altercation between Johnson and O'Toole at Wembley Arena in January 1987, reflecting the generally collapsing relationship between lead singer and the rest of the band. Things were so bad that fellow Liverpudlian singer Pete Wylie was approached to replace Johnson but declined the offer. FGTH completed the tour, but Johnson ultimately left the group thereafter, citing musical estrangement.

Aftermath
In the aftermath of the group split, Johnson was offered a solo recording agreement with MCA Records. However, ZTT, which maintained they had invested heavily in Liverpool (to the extent that the digital recording system used to record the album was very nearly treated as a sixth member of the band on the sleeve of the "Warriors of the Wasteland" single), had other ideas, and promptly sued Johnson in an attempt to hold him to his original contract with the label. Among other things, ZTT believed that as a departing member of FGTH, Johnson was required to release all solo material through the label until the band's original multiple-album agreement was fulfilled. The suit was bitterly fought, exposing the inner workings of the ZTT/Frankie machine to a giddy UK music press.

After two years, the High Court found in Johnson's favour, holding that the highly restrictive terms of the contract constituted an unreasonable restraint of trade. The court case also effectively freed the remaining members of FGTH from their ZTT contract.

Later years
Johnson's solo career at MCA commenced in 1989, with a succession of high-placed singles and the number one album Blast. The remix collection Hollelujah followed, trailed by a second studio album, Dreams That Money Can't Buy. However, Johnson's relations with MCA cooled with this release, and he would ultimately become a reclusive but successful painter, after announcing in 1993 that he was HIV-positive. The following year, Johnson recounted his version of Frankie's history in his autobiography A Bone in My Flute. His self-issued 1999 album Soulstream included a re-recording of "The Power of Love", which was also released as a single.

Paul Rutherford, the other openly gay member of the band, released the partially ABC produced album Oh World and a handful of singles before retiring with his New Zealander partner to Waiheke Island.

The "other three", as Smash Hits labelled them, continued to work together in what turned out to be a vain attempt to resurrect "Frankie" with various singers including Dee Harris from Fashion and Grant Boult (Jeckyl Ice) from The Premise, who had opened the shows on the band's UK and European tours. Under the name Boss Dog, with Boult on vocals, the band were offered a major deal with Virgin Records but on the condition they work as Frankie Goes to Hollywood. Johnson challenged the use of the name and the deal soured. Boult and Brian Nash continued with the material written by The Shuffle Brothers and under the name Low they released "Tearing My Soul Apart" in 1992 on Swanyard Records. As "Nasher", Nash released a 2002 solo album entitled Ripe. Ped worked behind the scenes and scored a top ten hit with the group "Lovestation". Mark O'Toole moved to Florida and played with punk outfit "Trapped by Mormons".

The band's name lived on to the extent that re-issues of "Relax" and "The Power of Love" both returned to the UK Top 10 in 1993. Remixes of "The Power of Love" (which became a dance anthem from its original ballad format) and "Two Tribes" were Top 20 hits again in 2000, while "Welcome to the Pleasuredome" also got commercially successful remix treatment, to the extent of a Top 20 placing four years earlier.

The group's first two singles appeared sixth and 22nd, respectively, in the official all-time UK best-selling singles list issued in 2002.

American impostor group
In 1998, a band calling itself alternately "Frankie Goes to Hollywood" and "The New Frankie Goes to Hollywood Featuring Davey Johnson" began to tour the United States. The band consisted of none of the original members of the band and formed without their knowledge or consent. The impostor band was led by an American using the stage name Davey Johnson, who alternately claimed he was Holly Johnson's brother and had performed as an uncredited session musician on Welcome to the Pleasuredome. The members of the actual band and their producer Trevor Horn refuted both claims. Mark O'Toole, who had been living in Florida, became aware of the band and warned concert promoters not to hire them. Likewise, A Flock of Seagulls frontman Mike Score, who had been a Liverpool acquaintance of the members of Frankie Goes to Hollywood, kicked the impostor band off his tour after discovering they were a fraud. After Holly Johnson contacted the trade magazine Pollstar to confirm that the American-based act was unauthorized, the impostor band was dropped by a booking agent, but continued to be booked by small clubs throughout the southern United States. The fake group continued to perform until at least September 2000, when a feature on the controversy was published in that month's issue of Spin.

Reunion and comeback
In 2003, the VH1 program Bands Reunited brought Johnson, Rutherford, Gill, Nash, and Mark O'Toole together, in the hope of their agreeing to perform impromptu on the show. However, a reunion performance did not transpire. Both Johnson and Nash had reservations about performing at short notice in the contrived manner dictated by the TV show format.

In 2004, a celebration of the 25th anniversary of Trevor Horn's involvement in the music industry a special concert took place at Wembley Arena in November, featuring three of the original FGTH line-up, Mark O'Toole, Peter (Ped) Gill and Paul Rutherford and another former member, Jed O'Toole. Original vocalist Johnson, who announced via the Internet that he would not be appearing, and guitarist Nash, who declined to appear for his own reasons, did not take part. Jed O'Toole took over guitar duties for the event, whilst an open audition was held for a new singer for the concert. Ryan Molloy was recruited as a result.

The same lineup reunited for a tour in 2005 playing festivals in Europe. They headlined the Big Gay Out festival at Hyde Park in London.

After some confusion with ensuing tour dates, the band posted a warning on their website that many of the tour dates listed by ticket promoters were inaccurate. The band became increasingly focused on the release of a new album during 2007. However, in early April 2007 came the news that Gill, Rutherford, J. O'Toole and Molloy had formed Forbidden Hollywood to play their new songs alongside old FGTH material. This was to avoid legal issues with Holly Johnson over use of the Frankie Goes to Hollywood name. Live dates were announced, but these were cancelled in June 2007.

Personnel

Principal members
 Holly Johnson – vocals (1980–1987)
 Paul Rutherford – vocals, keyboards, tambourine (1980–1987, 2004–2007)
 Mark O'Toole – vocals, bass (1980–1987, 2004–2007)
 Brian Nash – vocals, guitars (1982–1987)
 Peter Gill – drums (1980–1987, 2004–2007)
 Ryan Molloy – vocals (2004–2007)

Early members
 Jed O'Toole – vocals, guitars (1980–1982, 1984, 1987, 2004–2007)
 Sonia Mazumder – vocals (1980)

Awards and nominations
{| class=wikitable
|-
! Year !! Awards !! Work !! Category !! Result
|-
| rowspan="4" | 1984
| Ivor Novello Awards
| rowspan="2" | "Two Tribes"
| Best Song Musically And Lyrically
| 
|-
| rowspan="3" | NME Awards
| Promo Video
| 
|-
| Welcome to the Pleasuredome
| Best Dressed Sleeve
| 
|-
| rowspan="3" | "Relax"
| Best Single
| 
|-
| rowspan="9" | 1985
| Ivor Novello Awards
| Best Contemporary Song
| 
|-
| rowspan="5" | Brit Awards
| Best British Single
| 
|-
| rowspan="2" | Themselves
| Best British Newcomer
| 
|-
| Best British Group
| 
|-
| Welcome to the Pleasuredome
| Best British Album
| 
|-
| rowspan="3" | "Two Tribes"
| Best British Single
| 
|-
| rowspan="2" | MTV Video Music Awards
| Best New Artist
| 
|-
| Best Concept Video
| 
|-
| rowspan="2" | Pollstar Concert Industry Awards
| Themselves
| Which Artist is Most Likely to Successfully Headline Arenas for the First time in 1985?
| 
|-
| 1986
| Tour
| Small Hall/Club Tour of the Year
| 
|-
| 2010
| Q Awards
| "Relax"
| Classic Song
|

Discography

 Welcome to the Pleasuredome (1984)
 Liverpool (1986)

Computer game
In 1985, a computer game entitled Frankie Goes to Hollywood was developed by Denton Designs and published by Ocean Software. Based on the band's music, imagery and slogans, the objective of the game was to explore the town of Mundanesville to find the Pleasuredome. It also came boxed with an extra cassette with a live version of "Relax" on it.

References

External links

 Frankie Goes to Hollywood official website
 
 

Brit Award winners
British hi-NRG groups
Dance-rock musical groups
English new wave musical groups
British synth-pop new wave groups
LGBT-themed musical groups
Musical groups established in 1980
Musical groups from Liverpool
Musical quintets
Scouse culture of the early 1980s
ZTT Records artists
English synth-pop groups
Dance-pop groups
1980 establishments in England
Second British Invasion artists